The stripe-headed brushfinch is split into the following species:
 White-browed brushfinch,	Arremon torquatus
 Grey-browed brushfinch,	Arremon assimilis
 Black-headed brushfinch,	Arremon atricapillus
 Costa Rican brushfinch, Arremon costaricensis
 Perijá brushfinch, Arremon perijanus
 Sierra Nevada brushfinch, Arremon basilicus
 Caracas brushfinch, Arremon phaeopleurus
 Paria brushfinch, Arremon phygas

Birds by common name